And All the Pieces Matter - Five Years of Music from The Wire is a soundtrack album for the HBO television show The Wire, that was released on January 8, 2008.

Track listing

Personnel 

Ivan Ashford – vocals
Avery Bargasse – vocals
Karina Benznicki – production supervisor
James Bevelle – engineer, mixing
David Bither – executive producer
Cameron Brown – vocals
Andre Burke – violin
Greg Calbi – mastering
Eli Cane – production coordination
Milton Davis – producer
Michael Franti – producer
Ronen Givony – editorial coordinator
Loren Hill – producer
Andy Kris – mixing
Rod Lee – producer
Blake Leyh – mixing, producer
James Mbah – producer
Ivan Neville – producer
Nina K. Noble – producer
Mike Potter – engineer
Richard Shelton – producer
David Simon – executive producer
Karen L. Thorson – producer
Louis Tineo – producer
Jamal Roberts - producer
Juan Donovan - producer
Doreen Vail – arranger, producer

References

External links 
 Page on Nonsuch records

Television soundtracks
2008 soundtrack albums
Nonesuch Records soundtracks